Ilir Alliu (born 14 March 1973) is a former footballer who played for KF Tirana, Teuta Durrës, Flamurtari Vlorë, KF Elbasani as well as the Albania national team. He became the director of Sopoti Librazhd in March 2004 following his retirement but has since left the role.

International career
He made his debut for Albania in an August 1995 friendly match against Malta and earned a total of 3 caps, scoring no goals. His final international was a November 1996 FIFA World Cup qualification match against Armenia in Tirana.

Honours 
Teuta
Albanian National Championship (1): 1993–94
Albanian Cup (1): 1994–95

References

External links

1973 births
Living people
People from Librazhd
People from Elbasan County
Association football defenders
Albanian footballers
Albania under-21 international footballers
Albania international footballers
KF Tirana players
KF Teuta Durrës players
Flamurtari Vlorë players
KF Elbasani players